Suburban Cabaret (Germany: Vorstadtvarieté) is a 1935 Austrian musical drama film directed by Werner Hochbaum and starring Mathias Wieman, Luise Ullrich and Oskar Sima.

Cast
 Mathias Wieman as Josef Kernthaler, Bauzeichner 
 Luise Ullrich as Mizzi Ebeseder, seine Braut 
 Oskar Sima as Franz Ebeseder, ihr Bruder, Volkssänger 
 Lina Woiwode as Mutter Ebeseder 
 Olly Gebauer as Sophie, Volkssängerin 
 Hans Moser as Der alte Kernthaler 
 Frida Richard as Mutter Kernthaler 
 Rudolf Carl as Schulmeister Edelfink 
 Otto Hartmann as Leutnant von Daffinger 
 Anton Pointner as Oberleutnant Höfelmeyer 
 Fritz Imhoff as Der Feldwebel 
 Lilian Bergo as Mariska 
 Karl Skraup as Klavierspieler

References

Bibliography 
 Hake, Sabine. Popular Cinema of the Third Reich. University of Texas Press, 2001.

External links 
 

1935 films
Austrian musical drama films
1930s German-language films
1930s musical drama films
Films directed by Werner Hochbaum
Wiener Film
Austrian black-and-white films
1935 drama films
1930s German films